Sam Palumbo (born June 7, 1932) is a former linebacker in the National Football League. He was drafted by the Cleveland Browns in the fourth round of the 1955 NFL Draft and played two seasons with the team. During the 1957 NFL season he played with the Green Bay Packers and later was a member of the Buffalo Bills of the American Football League.

Although he suffered a shoulder dislocation diving for a fumble in a game against the Green Bay Packers in October 1955, Palumbo played in the NFL Championship Game on December 26, intercepting a pass in the second half of the Browns' 38–14 victory over the Los Angeles Rams.

As a student-athlete at the University of Notre Dame, he was a college roommate of Regis Philbin.

After retiring from pro football, Palumbo joined the Cleveland Football Officials Association and remained active as
an official for more than 40 years at the high school and collegiate level, mentoring countless newer officials during that time. On September 15, 2016, Palumbo was inducted into the Greater Cleveland Sports Hall of Fame.

References

1932 births
Players of American football from Cleveland
Cleveland Browns players
Green Bay Packers players
Buffalo Bills players
American football linebackers
Notre Dame Fighting Irish football players
Living people
American Football League players